Khandizaj (also Romanized as Khāndīzaj) is a village in Rahal Rural District, in the Central District of Khoy County, West Azerbaijan Province, Iran. At the time when the 2006 census was conducted, its population was 604, living within 121 families.

References 

Populated places in Khoy County